La Chaux-des-Breuleux railway station is a railway station in the municipality of La Chaux-des-Breuleux, in the Swiss canton of Jura. It is located on the  Tavannes–Noirmont railway line of Chemins de fer du Jura.

Services 
 the following services stop at La Chaux-des-Breuleux:

References

External links 
 
 

Railway stations in the canton of Jura
Chemins de fer du Jura stations